Maireana astrotricha, the low bluebush (a name it shares with Maireana planifolia), is a species of flowering plant in the family Amaranthaceae, native to a southern portion of the Northern Territory, central South Australia, western New South Wales, and adjacent parts of Queensland. It is usually found growing in open habitats, typically in gravelly, well-drained soils.

References

astrotricha
Endemic flora of Australia
Flora of the Northern Territory
Flora of South Australia
Flora of Queensland
Flora of New South Wales
Plants described in 1975